Original Sound Quality (OSQ) is an audio file format developed in 2002 by Steinberg Media Technologies GmbH and implemented e.g. in their audio editing software Wavelab 4 (and following releases) for lossless audio data compression.

In combination with good source material this format allows compression rates up to 50%. Because of that it is not comparable to other audio formats like MP3, which reach compression rates up to 90% because of their lossy compression algorithms. Therefore, OSQ is used rather for archiving then for daily use.

When using this format it is important to know that OSQ is a proprietary format developed by Steinberg that is generally speaking not supported by other audio software tools. A possible alternative to OSQ might be the free codec FLAC.

Sources
Translation of German Wikipedia article

References
Music Software Glossary OSQ
Emusic 01.11.2002: Wavelab 4.0
Golem 18.01.2002: Steinberg presents Wave-Editor WaveLab 4.0 (German article)

Computer file formats
Lossless audio codecs
Computer-related introductions in 2002
2002 software